Jasenov may refer to:

 Jasenov, Humenné District, a village in Slovakia
 Jasenov Castle
 Jasenov, Sobrance District, a village in Slovakia
 Jasenov Del, a village in Babušnica, Serbia

See also
 Jasen (disambiguation)
 Jasenová
 Jasenové
 Jasenovo (disambiguation)
 Jasenovce
 Jasenovac (disambiguation)